Leonidas Felix Livingston (April 3, 1832 – February 11, 1912) was a U.S. Representative from Georgia.

Early life and political involvement
Born near Covington, Georgia, Livingston attended the common schools, and engaged in agricultural pursuits.

He entered the Confederate States Army as a private in August 1861 and served throughout the American Civil War. He resumed agricultural pursuits in Newton County, Georgia, serving as member of the Georgia House of Representatives in 1876, 1877, and 1879 to 1881, and in the Georgia State Senate in 1882 and 1883. He served as vice president of the Georgia State Agricultural Society for eleven years and president four years, and as president of the Georgia State Alliance for three years.

U.S. Congress
Livingston was elected as a Democrat to the Fifty-second and to the nine succeeding Congresses (March 4, 1891 – March 3, 1911). He was an unsuccessful candidate for renomination in 1910.

Later years and death
He again engaged in agricultural pursuits in Newton County.
He died in Washington, D.C., on February 11, 1912, and was interred in Bethany Church Cemetery near Covington.

References

External links

1832 births
1912 deaths
Confederate States Army soldiers
Democratic Party members of the United States House of Representatives from Georgia (U.S. state)
Democratic Party members of the Georgia House of Representatives
Democratic Party Georgia (U.S. state) state senators
People from Newton County, Georgia
19th-century American politicians